The year 1835 in archaeology involved some significant events.

Explorations
 Henry Rawlinson begins study and decipherment from the cuneiform of the Behistun Inscription.
 Howard Vyse first visits Egypt.

Excavations

Finds
 Mars of Todi in Todi, Italy.

Publications
 Juan Galindo's description of the Maya site of Copán.
 John Gardner Wilkinson - Topography of Thebes, and general view of Egypt.

Births
 25 March - Worthington George Smith, English illustrator, palaeolithic archaeologist and mycologist (died 1917).
 22 June - Adolf Michaelis, German classical scholar (d. 1910).
 21 July - Robert Munro, Scottish archaeologist (d. 1920).

Deaths
 26 July - Caspar Reuvens, founder of the Dutch National Museum of Antiquities and the world's first professor of archaeology, dies at Rotterdam (b. 1793).

References

Archaeology
Archaeology by year
Archaeology
Archaeology